Oraine Williams (born 13 July 1992) is a Jamaican cricketer. He made his first-class debut for Jamaica in the 2016–17 Regional Four Day Competition on 7 April 2017. In June 2021, he was selected to take part in the Minor League Cricket tournament in the United States following the players' draft.

References

External links
 

1992 births
Living people
Jamaican cricketers
Jamaica cricketers
Place of birth missing (living people)